Alise may refer to:

People
Variant of Alice (given name)
Variant of Alix (given name)
Variant of Élise
Dame Alise, Alix Pahlavouni wife of Constantine of Baberon (died c. 1263), Armenian noble
Alise Post (1991) American BMX racer
Alise Alousi, Iraqi American poet living in Detroit
Marie-Alise Recasner, American actress

Places
Alise-Sainte-Reine a commune in the Côte-d'Or, site of pre-Roman town
Alise, name of ancient Alesia (city) taken by Julius Caesar in the Wars in Gaul

Other
 Alise (album), by Dzeltenie Pastnieki
 Association for Library and Information Science Education (ALISE)
 Princess Alise, a fictional character in the 2014 animated film The Swan Princess: A Royal Family Tale

See also
 Elise (disambiguation)
 Alice (disambiguation)
 Alis (disambiguation)